Alan Rhodes is a male former international table tennis player from England.

He won a bronze medal at the 1955 World Table Tennis Championships in the Swaythling Cup (men's team event) with Richard Bergmann, Brian Kennedy, Johnny Leach and Bryan Merrett for England.

He represented his county Middlesex.

See also
 List of England players at the World Team Table Tennis Championships
 List of World Table Tennis Championships medalists

References

English male table tennis players
Living people
World Table Tennis Championships medalists
Year of birth missing (living people)